Khandeshi is a language spoken in the Maharashtra state of India. It is spoken in the Khandesh region (Districts Dhule, Jalgaon and Nandurbar [धुळे, जळगाव आणि नंदुरबार]) wedged between the territory of Bhili and that of Marathi. It consists of Khandeshi proper, and the Dangri and Ahirani dialects. Kunbi and Rangari also are dialects. The words "Ahirani" and "Khandeshi" are sometimes used interchangeably: Ahirani as the caste-based name (after Ahirs), and Khandesh as the region-based name.

Etymology 
A detailed study of the various etymologies of the word Khandesh appears in the book Ahirani Boli by Dr. Ramesh Suryawanshi.

Ahirani is a major dialect of Khandeshi.  It was originally spoken by the Ahirs  living in the Khandesh region. It is further divided into region-based sub-dialects such as Chalisgaon, Dhule, Malegaon and Dhule group. Ahirani is spoken in the Jalgaon (except Bhusaval, Jamner, Bodwad and Muktainagar) and Nandurbar, Dhule. Outside Khandesh, it is spoken in some parts of Nashik (Baglan, Malegaon,Deola and Kalwan tehsils) and Aurangabad. People in the tehsils of Dharangaon, Chopda, Amalner, Sakri, Sindkheda, Dondaicha-Warwade, Shirpur, Taloda, Shahada, Dhadgaon, Akkalkuwa, Navapur, Raver, Parola, Erandol, Bhadgaon, Pachora speak Ahirani and Marathi. In Nashik District 'KASMADE patta' is known as Ahirani speaking belt, region. The word 'KASMADE patta' patta means region of tehsils of Kalwan, Baglan, Malegaon, Deola,  also speak slightly different dialect of Ahirani. In the neighbouring state of Gujarat, it is spoken in Surat and Vyara, and in Burhanpur, Ahirani is spoken in and around Amba-Varla. Research by Dr. Ramesh Suryawashi suggests that the Ahirani dialect is also spoken in Dharni tehsil of Amravati district, around the Melghat Tiger Reserve forest area. But it is known as Gavali Boli there. Around 30-35 thousand people speak Gavai boli in 40 villages.

According to the 1971 census of India, the number of people who declared Ahirani as their mother tongue was 363,780. A 2011 estimate of the population of the Dhulia, Jalgaon and Nandurbar districts, and the Ahirani speaker tehsils of Aurangabad and Nasik district was 10 million.

The non-Ahirs in the region (such as Maratha, Lewa, Wani Bhil and Kunbi castes) started speaking variants of Ahirani mixed with their dialects while interacting with the Ahirs, which led to the birth of other dialects of the language. Chandwadi is spoken around Chandwad hills, Nandubari is spoken around Nandurbar, Jamneri is spoken around Jamner tehsil, Taptangi is spoken by the side of Tapi, Tapti river. Dongarangi is spoken by the side of forest Ajanta hills. All these are region-based names for Khandeshi sub-dialects. Ahirani, Gujar, Bhilau, Maharau, Lewa and Purbhi all are social (caste-based) categories of Khandeshi. Several castes speak their own dialect at home but use Khandeshi for their daily communication outside their communities.

The people residing in Nandurbar region of Maha-Gujrat border speak a dialect named as Gujar which is very different from ahirani and close to Gujrathi. These language also used in community and at market places at many towns such as Shahada, Taloda, Mhasawad etc.

Grammar and vocabulary 

Standard Marathi and Ahirani are different in structure. This indicates that the source and development of these two languages are independent. As a Western Indo-Aryan language, the Ahirani language is closer to Rajashthani and Gujarati. 

Borrowing and bending the words from Rajasthani, Gujarati and Hindi, Ahirani has created its own words not found in any of these languages. Ahirani is basically in colloquial form and uses the Devanagari script for its writing.

Educated Khandeshis speak standard Marathi as well as Ahirani. In the urban areas, Ahirani is losing its popularity among such people to standard Marathi, but in the rural areas, Ahirani dominates. The language is widely used among the farmers and villagers. It is also known for its secret words used by goldsmiths, cattle sellers, fruit-purchasers, known only to the members of that community.

Literature 

Being a rural language, Ahirani has not produced much literature. Bahinabai Chaudhari (1880-1951) is a well-known poet of Khandesh, and the study of her literature is studied and included in Marathi language sources. The language in her poems is different from Ahirani, but influenced by Ahirani. The poet is not Ahirani, but Lewa (a dialect of Khandeshi).

Linguistic research 

Dr. Ramesh Sitaram Suryawanshi has authored following works on Ahirani:

 Ahirani Bhasha Vaidnynik Abhyasa (1997), a linguistic study, which explains the grammar formation of words and formation of sentences in Ahirani. Akshaya Prakashan, Pune
 Ahirani-shabdkosh (1997), the first dictionary of the Ahirani dialect, with nearly 10000 words arranged lexicographically. Akshaya Prakashan, Pune
 Aharani Mhani Ani Wakprachar (1997) 
 One thousand sayings and four thousand proverbs in the Ahirani dialect, with the illustration of their meanings. Akshaya Prakashan, Pune
 Khandeshatil Krishak Jivan Sachitra Kosha (2002), a pictorial dictionary of words used by the farmers in Khandesh. The book contains pictures of the tools used by farmers, with all tools and parts labeled with local names in Ahirani dialect. Published by Maharashtra State Government's Sahitya Ani Sanskriti Mandal, Mumbai.
 Khandeshatil Mhani (2010) , Abhyasika, Kannad. Dist Aurangabad June -2010 Pages 224
 Boli Aani Praman Bhasha (2010) in Khandeshi. , Abhyasika, Kannad.Dist.Aurangabad (Mah.) 431103
 Loksahitya Aani Abhyas Vishay (2010) in Khandeshi. , Abhyasika, Kannad.Dist.Aurangabad (Mah.) 431103
 Aadiwasi Thakar Dot Com (2016 ) Pages 248, Abhyasika, Kannad, Dist.Aurangabad (Mah.) 431103

References

Indo-Aryan languages